Caribou River Provincial Wilderness Park is a provincial park in extreme north-central Manitoba, Canada. It is the northernmost provincial park in Manitoba, and borders the southern Nunavut border.

The park is considered to be a Class Ib protected area under the IUCN protected area management categories. It protects an area of the Taiga Shield Ecozone (CEC), including boreal forest, rivers and lakes, and low-lying wetlands forming extensive peatlands (bogs and fens).  The park has a fairly rolling terrain with many rocky outcrops. Glacial till has been shaped into a mosaic of ridges and eskers, sinuous, rounded ridges deposited by during glaciation.

See also
List of protected areas of Manitoba
List of Manitoba parks

References

External links
 Caribou River Provincial Park on iNaturalist

Provincial parks of Manitoba
Parks in Northern Manitoba
Protected areas of Manitoba